HAUS augmin-like complex subunit 3 is a protein that in humans is encoded by the HAUS3 gene.

References

Further reading